Dr Halit Cıngıllıoğlu (born 1954) Cingillioglu family’s roots originate from Kayseri, a central Anatolian town that is well known for its successful entrepreneurs in industrial and commercial activities. The Cıngıllıoğlu family is one of them with their companies originating from the early 1900s. The family established the first private electricity distribution business in Türkiye (still owned by the family) owns companies in different sectors including energy production, distribution, banking, insurance, leasing, factoring and real estate.
 
Apart from his interests in family businesses, Dr Cıngıllıoğlu is the founder and principal shareholder of C Group, a Turkish conglomerate consisting of banking and financial services companies in Republic of Türkiye, Netherlands, Germany, Belgium, Romania, and Kyrgyz Republic.
 
Born into a family of banking business, Dr Cıngıllıoğlu  has been in the banking/finance business throughout his career. Aside his current director position at HCBG Holding BV (of which he is the 100% shareholder), he has been active in the financial sector since the early 1970s, occupying various executive and chair positions in several banks, brokerage houses, leasing, factoring and insurance companies, including his former member position at the Istanbul Stock Exchange.
 
He is the principal shareholder of DHB Bank (Nederland) NV in The Netherlands, a bank that Dr Cıngıllıoğlu has an ongoing partnership with the Turkish state; his partner in this bank is with 30% stake Turkiye Halk Bankasi A.S. (Halkbank), the top 6th bank in Türkiye in terms of asset size. This bank’s majority owner is the Turkish state while 75.3% of its shares are publicly listed on the Istanbul Stock Exchange.
 
Dr Cıngıllıoğlu  holds PhD and MBA degrees in finance from universities in the USA. From his prior education, he also holds degrees from schools in the Republic of Türkiye, France and Switzerland. He has also been awarded with an Honorary Doctorate Degree in finance by the Senate of Erciyes University in Türkiye. Aside his native Turkish language, he speaks French and English fluently.
 
Based on his contributions to the society and the development of business environment, Dr Cıngıllıoğlu holds a State High Service Medal, a highest level of recognition and respect by the Turkish state and awarded by the President of the Republic of Türkiye. He has served as the Honorary Consul of The Republic of Türkiye in Bruges, Belgium until December 2022.
 
Dr Cıngıllıoğlu is also one of the best known names world-wide in the field of art. He has been involved in collecting artwork since his childhood and is known as a major art collector. According to ART news magazine he is listed among the top ten collectors worldwide in the impressionist, modern, post-war and contemporary art fields. As a worldwide expert in art, he is a member of the International Council of Sotheby's where the company benefits from his experience and knowledge.
He is married and has two children.

See also: List of most expensive paintings#cite note-49 (List of most expensive paintings)

References

 2009 YILI ONUR ODULLERI
 Demir Halk Bank
  Demir Kyrgyz International Bank
 Güneysu Martyr Kemal Mutlu Anatolian Teacher High School
 shareholder of C Factoring

1954 births
Living people
20th-century Turkish businesspeople
Turkish art collectors